Synergistes jonesii is a species of bacteria, the type species of its genus. It is a rumen bacterium that degrades toxic pyridinediols including mimosine. It is obligately anaerobic, gram-negative and rod-shaped. It was discovered in 1981 by Raymond J. Jones in Hawaii and Jones' hypothesis was proven in 1986 by himself and R. G. Megarrity.

References

Further reading
Graham, Mr Samuel. "Introduction, impact and retention of Synergistes jonesii in cattle herds grazing Leucaena leucocephala." (2010).

External links
LPSN

Synergistota
Bacteria described in 1993